Gabriel James Byrne (born 12 May 1950) is an Irish actor, film director, film producer, screenwriter, audiobook narrator, and author. His acting career began in the Focus Theatre before he joined London's Royal Court Theatre in 1979. Byrne's screen debut came in the Irish drama serial The Riordans and the spin-off show Bracken.

He has starred in more than 70 films for some of cinema's best known directors. For his Broadway work, he has received two Tony nominations for roles in the work of Eugene O'Neill as well as the Outer Critics Circle Award for A Touch of the Poet. For his television work, Byrne has been nominated for three Emmys. For his performance in HBO's American drama In Treatment (2008–2010) in the role of Paul Weston, one of his most identifiable roles, he won a Golden Globe Award and was nominated for two Emmy Awards and two Satellite Awards.

He has starred in many films, including: Excalibur (1981), Miller's Crossing (1990), The Usual Suspects (1995), Stigmata (1999), End of Days (1999), Spider (2002), Jindabyne (2006), Vampire Academy (2014), The 33 (2015), and Hereditary (2018), and co-wrote The Last of the High Kings (1996). Byrne has also produced several films, including the Academy Award–nominated In the Name of the Father (1993). Since 2019, he has starred in a TV series adaptation of War of the Worlds.

In 2018, Byrne was awarded the Irish Film and Television Academy Lifetime Achievement Award for his contribution to Irish cinema. In 2020, he was listed at number 17 on The Irish Times list of Ireland's greatest film actors. The Guardian named him one of the best actors never to have received an Academy Award nomination.

Early life
Gabriel James Byrne was born on 12 May 1950 in Walkinstown, Dublin, Ireland, the son of devoutly Roman Catholic parents. His father Dan was a soldier and cooper, while his mother Eileen (née Gannon), from Elphin, County Roscommon, was a hospital nurse. He has five younger siblings: Donal, Thomas, Breda, Margaret, and a sister who died at an early age, Marian.

Byrne attended Ardscoil Éanna secondary school in Crumlin, where he later taught Spanish and history. He attended University College Dublin, where he studied archaeology, Spanish and linguistics, and graduated with a BA in 1972, becoming proficient in the Irish language. He went on to complete a Higher Diploma in Education (HDipEd) in 1973.

About his early training to become a priest, he said in an interview, "I spent five years in the seminary and I suppose it was assumed that one had a vocation. I realised subsequently that I didn't." 

He played football in Dublin with Stella Maris.

In January 2011, he spoke in an interview on The Meaning of Life about being sexually abused by priests during his childhood.

Career
Byrne worked in archaeology when he left UCD. He maintained his love of his language, later writing the first television drama in Irish, Draíocht, on Ireland's national Irish-language television station, TG4, when it began broadcasting in 1996.

Before becoming an actor, Byrne had many jobs, including archaeologist, cook, and Spanish and history school teacher at Ardscoil Éanna in Crumlin. He started acting at age 29, and began his career on stage with the Focus Theatre and the Abbey Theatre in Dublin. He later joined the Performing Arts Course at Roslyn Park College in Sandymount. He came to prominence on the final season of the Irish television show The Riordans, subsequently starring in his own spin-off series, Bracken. His first play for television was Michael Feeney Callan's Love Is ... (RTÉ). He made his film debut in 1981, as King Uther Pendragon in John Boorman's King Arthur epic, Excalibur.

In 1983, he appeared with Richard Burton in the miniseries Wagner, co-starring Laurence Olivier, John Gielgud and Ralph Richardson. In 1985, he starred in the acclaimed political thriller Defence of the Realm, though he subsequently claimed he had been upstaged by his co-star, veteran actor Denholm Elliott: "I amended the actor's cliché to 'Never work with children, animals or Denholm Elliott'." In the 90s, his production company Plurabelle Films received a first look deal with Phoenix Pictures.

In 2007, he led the jury of the Kerry Film Festival.

Upon his return to theatre in 2008, he appeared as King Arthur in Camelot with the New York Philharmonic from 7 to 10 May, following the footsteps of veteran actors Richard Burton and Richard Harris. Byrne was cast in a film adaptation of Flann O'Brien's metafictional novel At Swim-Two-Birds, alongside Colin Farrell and Cillian Murphy. Actor Brendan Gleeson was set to direct the film. In October 2009, however, Gleeson expressed fear that, should the Irish Film Board be abolished as planned by the Irish State, the production might fall through.

Byrne starred as therapist Paul Weston in the HBO series In Treatment from 2008 to 2010. He was named as TV's "latest Dr. McDreamy" by The New York Times for this role, and won the Golden Globe Award for Best Actor in a Drama Series in 2008. He also received his first Emmy Award nomination (Best Lead Actor in a Drama Series) for the 60th Primetime Emmy Awards that same year.

In 2011, he signed up to appear in a film by director Costa-Gavras, Le Capital, an adaptation of Stéphane Osmont's novel of the same name. In 2013, he starred as Earl Haraldson in the first season of Vikings opposite Travis Fimmel and Clive Standen.

In 2017, he appeared in Mad to Be Normal (previously titled Metanoia), a biopic of the Scottish psychiatrist R. D. Laing, produced by Gizmo Films.

Walking With Ghosts, Byrne's one-man show based on his memoir of the same title (published by Grove Press in January 2021), premiered at the Gaiety Theatre, Dublin on 1 February, 2022, before playing at the Edinburgh International Festival. It opened on 6 September, 2022 at the Apollo Theatre in London, marking Byrne’s West End debut at the age of 72, in ‘a career-best performance’, and opened on 26 October, 2022 at the Music Box Theatre on Broadway.

Personal life

Byrne had a 12-year relationship with television producer and presenter Aine O'Connor, from 1974 to 1986.

He began a relationship with actress Ellen Barkin, and relocated to Manhattan to be with her. A year later, in 1988, he married Barkin, with whom he has two children, John "Jack" Daniel (born 1989) and Romy Marion (born 1992). The couple separated amicably in 1993, and divorced in 1999.

At the fifth Jameson Dublin International Film Festival in 2007, Byrne was presented with the first of the new Volta awards, for lifetime achievement in acting. He received the Honorary Patronage of the University Philosophical Society, of Trinity College Dublin on 20 February 2007. In November 2007, he was awarded an honorary degree by the National University of Ireland, Galway; the president of the university, Iognáid Ó Muircheartaigh, said that the award was in recognition of the actor's "outstanding contribution to Irish and international film".

Although Byrne is a fiercely private person, he released a documentary for the 20th Galway Film Fleadh in the summer of 2008 called Stories from Home, an intimate portrait about his life. It premiered in the United States in September 2009 at the Los Angeles Irish Film Festival.

Byrne mentioned in interviews and his 1994 autobiography, Pictures in My Head that he hates being called "brooding". He has been listed by People as one of the "Sexiest Men Alive". Entertainment Weekly has also dubbed Byrne as one of the hottest celebrities over the age of 50.

He married his partner, Hannah Beth King, on 4 August 2014 at Ballymaloe House in County Cork. Their daughter, Maisie James, was born in February 2017. As of 2021, Byrne lives with his family in Rockport, Maine.

Byrne is an atheist and has been vocally critical of the Catholic Church, which he described in a 2011 interview with The Guardian as "repressive of women and minorities and repressive of its followers". In the same interview, he said that he still reads the Bible "for the fables".

He was cultural ambassador for Ireland until he criticised The Gathering, a tourism initiative to encourage people of Irish heritage to visit the country, describing it as "a scam" and adding that the majority of Irish people "don't give a shit about the diaspora except to shake them down for a few quid". Byrne also criticised the marketing strategy employed by Guinness known as Arthur's Day as "a cynical piece of exercise in a country which has a huge drinking problem".

Filmography

Film

Television

Stage

Awards and nominations

Honours
In 2007, NUI Galway awarded him an honorary doctorate for his outstanding contribution to Irish and international film, theatre and the arts.

Books
 
 
In his book 'Walking With Ghosts' Gabriel claims that Margaret Thatcher abolished school milk. The matter is politically controversial, as Conservatives claim the process was started by the previous P.M., Harold Wilson from Labour.

References

Further reading

External links
 
 
 
 
 Gabriel Byrne profile, artforamnesty.org; accessed 11 August 2017
 Gabriel Byrne video interview, jewreview.net; accessed 11 August 2017
 Gabriel Byrne discusses his role on In Treatment, npr.org, 30 May 2009
 Gabriel Byrne tells of childhood sexual abuse, Guardian.co.uk, 19 January 2010

1950 births
Living people
21st-century Irish male actors
20th-century Irish male actors
Association footballers not categorized by position
Audiobook narrators
Best Drama Actor Golden Globe (television) winners
Former Roman Catholics
Irish emigrants to the United States
Irish film producers
Irish male film actors
Irish male soap opera actors
Irish male television actors
Irish male voice actors
Irish male writers
Irish male screenwriters
Jacob's Award winners
Male actors from Dublin (city)
Film people from Dublin (city)
Stella Maris F.C. players
Irish atheists
Irish former Christians
Critics of the Catholic Church
Theatre World Award winners
Association football players not categorized by nationality